Huelyn Wayne Duvall (August 18, 1939 – May 15, 2019) was an American rock and roll and rockabilly musician.

Career
Huelyn Duvall was born on August 18, 1939 in Garner, Texas to William Daniel Duvall and Ila Lee Measures Duvall. Duvall is known for his 1950's recordings such as "Little Boy Blue", "Boom Boom Baby", "Three Months To Kill", "Pucker Paint", and "Double Talkin' Baby", among others. He has performed with Eddie Cochran, Johnny Horton, Bobby Darin, Dale Hawkins, The Champs, and others.  "Little Boy Blue" charted on Billboard in 1958, and Eddie Cochran told him it was one of his favourite songs. Duvall recorded "Boom Boom Baby" two years prior to Billy "Crash" Craddock and his version of "Double Talkin' Baby" was sent to Gene Vincent as well as "Modern Romance" to Sanford Clark.

Duvall died on May 15, 2019, at age 79.

Legacy
Huelyn Duvall was named as an influence by Robert Plant.

Discography

Singles
 1957 – "Teen Queen" b/w "Comin' Or Goin'" (Challenge, CH-1012)
 1958 – "Hum-Dinger" b/w "You Knock Me Out" (Challenge, 59002)
 1958 – "Little Boy Blue" b/w "Three Months To Kill" (Challenge, 59014) No. 88 U.S. Pop 
 1958 – "Friday Night On A Dollar Bill" b/w "Juliet" (Challenge, 59025)
 1959 – "Across The Aisle" b/w "It's No Wonder" (Starfire, 600)
 1959 – "Tearstained Letters" b/w "Beautiful Dreamer" (Twinkle, 506) 
 1960 – "Pucker Paint" b/w "Boom Boom Baby" (Challenge, 59069)
 2015 – "Blue Suede Shoes" feat. Long John and his Ballroom Kings (Rydell's, RR 721, France)
(Some of the singles were released in Sparton records and Apex in Canada as well)

Albums
 2003 – She's My Baby (Brazos Valley Records)
 2004 – The Reunion (Brazos Valley Records)
 2004 – Ramblin' + Boppin''' (Rhythm Bomb Records)
 2008 – Get Carried Away (Goofin' Records)
 2015 – Original Singles Collection (CAB Records)

EPs
 2011 – Baby Make A Move (Goofin' Records)
 2014 – Double Talkin' Baby (Sleazy Records)
 2016 – Got a Little Girl (CAB Records)
 2018 – Greetings From El Paso (CAB Records)

Compilations
 1996 – Is You is or is You Ain't? (Sundazed Records)
 2003 – Three Months to Kill'' (Collector Records)

Personnel 
Huelyn Duvall – Guitar and vocals
The Jordanaires – Backing vocals on "Friday Night On A Dollar Bill", "You Knock Me Out", "Boom Boom Baby", and the unissued- "Fools Hall Of Fame"

References

External links
 Huelyn Duvall official website
 Huelyn Duvall discography on Rockin' Country Style
 Huelyn Duvall discography at WangDangDula.com
 Discogs entry
 

1939 births
2019 deaths
American rock musicians
American rockabilly musicians
Challenge Records artists
Challenge Records (1950s) artists